Charles Herbert Brown (28 August 1873 – 23 October 1941) was an Australian rules footballer who played with Carlton in the Victorian Football League (VFL).

Notes

External links 
		
Charlie Brown's profile at Blueseum

1873 births
1941 deaths
Australian rules footballers from Melbourne
Carlton Football Club players